The Unemployment Insurance Act 1924 was passed when the British Labour Party was in power in 1924. The Act arose from a dispute over the means testing of benefits. The Labour Cabinet disagreed on whether means testing should be abolished or whether such a move would prove too costly. The compromise was that the test for receiving benefits would be whether a person was "genuinely seeking work". The 1924 Act extended to "genuinely seeking work" test to all benefited claims.

References

Insurance legislation
United Kingdom Acts of Parliament 1924
1924 in economics
Unemployment in the United Kingdom